Beirut in Lebanon has been the site of several battles in history.
 Siege of Beirut (1110), a battle during the Crusades
 Battle of Beirut (1840), a battle during the Egyptian–Ottoman War (1839–1841)
 Battle of Beirut (1912), a naval battle during the Italo-Turkish War
 Battle of Beirut (1941), a battle over control of the city during World War II
 Siege of Beirut (1982), a siege by Israel during the 1982 Lebanon War